Sophisticated Games is a UK-based developer of board games best known for its series of Lord of the Rings games which are based directly on J. R. R. Tolkien's books. It also publishes LOTR role playing games and The War of The Ring series in association with Ares Games in Italy. The company started up in 1998 in Cambridge, UK and is run by ex book publisher Robert Hyde in partnership with Ken Howard and Sophia Hyde.

Sophisticated Games is also the originator of the abstract game by Reiner Knizia entitled Ingenious, also known as Einfach Genial in Germany. It first appeared as Mensa The Board Game. This game much encouraged the subsequent trend towards abstract games in the industry when it was published in 2003. 

Recent publications include Gormenghast, Scotland the Board Game, Callisto and Beowulf.

External links
 Sophisticated Games Home Page

Companies established in 1998
Game manufacturers